Vitry-en-Perthois is a commune in the Marne department in north-eastern France.

History
Vitry-en-Perthois was called Vitry-le-Brûlé (Vitry the burnt) after being burnt two times; in 1142 by the armies of Louis VII of France and in 1544 by the armies of Charles V.

Geography
The Chée flows into the Saulx in the northern part of the commune.

The Saulx forms part of the commune's eastern border, then flows westward through the commune and crosses the village.

See also
Communes of the Marne department

References

Vitryenperthois